Sebastián Valle Velásquez (born July 24, 1990) is a Mexican professional baseball catcher for the Leones de Yucatán of the Mexican Baseball League. He played for the Mexico national team in the 2013 World Baseball Classic and the 2017 World Baseball Classic.

Career

Philadelphia Phillies
Valle began his professional career in 2009 with the Lakewood BlueClaws of the Philadelphia Phillies organization. Valle, along with Jarred Cosart, represented the Phillies at the 2011 All-Star Futures Game.

Valle was added to the Phillies 40 man roster on November 18, 2011. Valle spent the 2012 season in the minors without making a major league appearance. and did not make a major league appearance during the 2013 season as well. On December 18, 2013 the Phillies designated Valle for assignment, to make room for the newly signed Roberto Hernández. The Phillies outrighted Valle to the minor leagues, and invited him to spring training in 2014. He became a free agent following the 2014 season.

Pittsburgh Pirates
On November 20, 2014, Valle signed a minor league deal with the Pittsburgh Pirates that included an invitation to Spring Training. Valle spent the entire season in the minors with the Pirates and elected free agency on November 6, 2015.

New York Yankees
On December 17, 2015, Valle signed a minor league deal with the New York Yankees. Valle elected free agency on November 7, 2016, after another season in the minors.

Seattle Mariners
On December 1, 2016, Valle signed a minor league deal with the Seattle Mariners. Valle was invited to Spring Training for the 2017 season but did not make the club and was assigned to the Tacoma Rainiers. Valle was released by the Mariners organization on July 8, 2017.

Leones de Yucatán
On July 11, 2017, Valle was assigned to the Leones de Yucatán of the Mexican Baseball League. He spent time with the Leones in every season through the 2019 season. He did not play in a game in 2020 due to the cancellation of the LMB season because of the COVID-19 pandemic.

References

External links

1990 births
Living people
Altoona Curve players
Arizona League Mariners players
Baseball players from Sinaloa
Cañeros de Los Mochis players
Clearwater Threshers players
Dominican Summer League Phillies players
Mexican expatriate baseball players in the Dominican Republic
Florida Complex League Phillies players
Lakewood BlueClaws players
Lehigh Valley IronPigs players
Leones de Yucatán players
Mexican expatriate baseball players in the United States
Mexican League baseball catchers
Reading Fightin Phils players
Reading Phillies players
Sportspeople from Los Mochis
Williamsport Crosscutters players
2013 World Baseball Classic players
2017 World Baseball Classic players